Hans Hagerup Krag (9 August 1829 – 8 May 1907) was a Norwegian engineer.

He was hired as an engineer in the Norwegian Public Roads Administration in 1852, and served as director of the Norwegian Directorate of Public Roads from 1874 to 1903. Also, together with Thomas Heftye he founded the Norwegian Mountain Touring Association in 1868. From 1879 to 1883 and 1893 to 1895 he was the chairman of the Norwegian Polytechnic Society.

References

1829 births
1907 deaths
Norwegian engineers
Directors of government agencies of Norway
Directorate of Public Roads people